In Greek mythology, Coeus (Koios, "query, questioning" or "intelligence"), also called Polus,  was one of the Titans, one of the three groups of children born to Uranus (Sky) and Gaia (Earth).

Mythology 
Coeus was an obscure figure, and like most of the Titans he played no active part in Greek mythology—he appears only in lists of Titans—but was primarily important for his descendants. With his sister, "shining" Phoebe, Coeus fathered two daughters, Leto and Asteria. Leto copulated with Zeus (the son of fellow Titans Cronus and Rhea) and bore Artemis and Apollo. Asteria became the mother of Hecate by Perses (son of fellow Titan Crius and half-sister Eurybia).

Along with the other Titans, Coeus was overthrown by Zeus and the other Olympians in the Titanomachy. Afterwards, he and all his brothers (sans Oceanus) were imprisoned in Tartarus by Zeus. Coeus, later overcome with madness, broke free from his bonds and attempted to escape his imprisonment, but was repelled by Cerberus.

Tacitus wrote that Coeus was the first inhabitant of the island of Kos, which claimed to be the birthplace of his daughter Leto.

Eventually Zeus freed the Titans, presumably including Coeus.

Genealogy

Notes

References 

 Anonymous, The Homeric Hymns and Homerica with an English Translation by Hugh G. Evelyn-White. Homeric Hymns. Cambridge, MA.,Harvard University Press; London, William Heinemann Ltd. 1914. Online version at the Perseus Digital Library. Greek text available from the same website.
 Pindar, Odes, Diane Arnson Svarlien. 1990. Online version at the Perseus Digital Library.
 Clement of Alexandria, Recognitions from Ante-Nicene Library Volume 8, translated by Smith, Rev. Thomas. T. & T. Clark, Edinburgh. 1867. Online version at theoi.com.
 Diodorus Siculus, The Library of History translated by Charles Henry Oldfather. Twelve volumes. Loeb Classical Library. Cambridge, Massachusetts: Harvard University Press; London: William Heinemann, Ltd. 1989. Vol. 3. Books 4.59–8. Online version at Bill Thayer's Web Site
 Diodorus Siculus, Bibliotheca Historica. Vol 1-2. Immanel Bekker. Ludwig Dindorf. Friedrich Vogel. in aedibus B. G. Teubneri. Leipzig. 1888–1890. Greek text available at the Perseus Digital Library.
 Gaius Valerius Flaccus, Argonautica translated by Mozley, J H. Loeb Classical Library Volume 286. Cambridge, MA, Harvard University Press; London, William Heinemann Ltd. 1928. Online version at theoi.com.
 Gaius Valerius Flaccus, Argonauticon. Otto Kramer. Leipzig. Teubner. 1913. Latin text available at the Perseus Digital Library.
 
 Hesiod, Theogony from The Homeric Hymns and Homerica with an English Translation by Hugh G. Evelyn-White, Cambridge, MA.,Harvard University Press; London, William Heinemann Ltd. 1914. Online version at the Perseus Digital Library. Greek text available from the same website.
 Historiae Romanorum: Coeus 
 Hyginus, Fabulae from The Myths of Hyginus translated and edited by Mary Grant. University of Kansas Publications in Humanistic Studies. Online version at the Topos Text Project.
 Pseudo-Apollodorus, The Library with an English Translation by Sir James George Frazer, F.B.A., F.R.S. in 2 Volumes, Cambridge, MA, Harvard University Press; London, William Heinemann Ltd. 1921. Online version at the Perseus Digital Library. Greek text available from the same website.
 Publius Ovidius Naso, Metamorphoses translated by Brookes More (1859-1942). Boston, Cornhill Publishing Co. 1922. Online version at the Perseus Digital Library.
 Publius Ovidius Naso, Metamorphoses. Hugo Magnus. Gotha (Germany). Friedr. Andr. Perthes. 1892. Latin text available at the Perseus Digital Library.
 Stewart, Michael. "People, Places & Things: Coeus", Greek Mythology: From the Iliad to the Fall of the Last Tyrant.
 Tacitus, Complete Works of Tacitus. Tacitus. Alfred John Church. William Jackson Brodribb. Sara Bryant. edited for Perseus. New York. : Random House, Inc. Random House, Inc. reprinted 1942. Online text available at Perseus.tufts.
 The Hymns of Orpheus. Translated by Taylor, Thomas (1792). University of Pennsylvania Press, 1999. Online version at theoi.com

External links 
 COEUS from The Theoi Project
 COEUS from Mythopedia

Greek gods
Children of Gaia
Titans (mythology)
Condemned souls in Tartarus
Metamorphoses characters
Kos
Leto